Nareva is an energy company in Morocco wholly owned by the SNI, the holding company of king Mohammed VI.

Activities

Renewables
The company has multiple wind farm projects. The units in Akhenfir, Haouma and Foum El Oued, with a capacity of 100 MW; 50 MW and 50 MW respectively, sell electricity directly to industrial clients, whereas the one in Tarfaya (300 MW) sells its production to the ONEE, under a 20-years contract and through a structure called TAREC (Tarfaya Energy Company), a 50–50 venture with GDF Suez.

Coal energy
Nareva is in the process of constructing a coal-powered electricity generation unit in Safi. The facility is under construction and is set to open in 2017. Its biggest client is set to be the country biggest industrial operator, the OCP, the phosphate mining company. Nareva, through its subsidiary Safi Energy Company, would sell electricity to the state-owned ONEE (Office National de l'Electricité et de l'Eau) under a 30-year contract.

See also

Jorf Lasfar Energy Company, a similar company owned by TAQA operating in Jorf Lasfar.
Desertec

References

Société Nationale d'Investissement
2005 establishments in Morocco
Energy companies of Morocco